Gemitaš (Serbian Cyrillic: Гемиташ) is a mountain in Kosovo, located in the Šar Mountains. It is surrounded by many lakes and is near the village of Restelica.

Notes

References

Mountains of Kosovo
Šar Mountains
Two-thousanders of Kosovo